Liahona may refer to:
Liahona (Book of Mormon), in the Book of Mormon, a brass ball of "curious workmanship" that provided directions for Lehi and his party while traveling
Liahona (magazine), a periodical published by The Church of Jesus Christ of Latter-day Saints
Liahona High School, a high school in Tonga owned by The Church of Jesus Christ of Latter-day Saints
Liahona Preparatory Academy, a private school in Pleasant Grove, Utah